Andreas Karl Engel (born 7 January 1961)  is a German neuroscientist. He is the director of the Department of Neurophysiology and Pathophysiology at the University Medical Center Hamburg-Eppendorf (UKE).

Life 
Andreas Engel studied medicine and philosophy at Saarland University, Homburg, at the Technical University of Munich, and at the Goethe University Frankfurt in Germany. After his medical exams (German Staatsexamen), he received his Doctor of Medicine (Dr. med.) from the Technical University Munich in 1987. 

In 1987–1995 Engel was a post-doctoral fellow with Wolf Singer at the Max Planck Institute for Brain Research, Frankfurt, Germany. From 1996-2000, Engel headed a research group at the Max Planck Institute for Brain Research which was funded by the Heisenberg Program of the German Research Foundation (DFG). Between fall 1997 and summer 1998, he also was affiliated as a Daimler-Benz Fellow to the Berlin Institute for Advanced Study. 

From 2000-2002, he worked at the Jülich Research Centre as head of the Cellular Neurobiology Group at the Institute for Medicine. In 2002, he was appointed to the Chair of Neurophysiology at the UKE. Engel is a member of the Academy of Sciences and Humanities in Hamburg. Since 2011, he is the coordinator of Collaborative Research Centre SFB 936 "Multi-Site Communication in the Brain" (with C. Gerloff, Dept. of Neurology, UKE).

Research 
Andreas Engel has become known by his work on the so-called "binding problem". His research focuses on the hypothesis that temporal synchrony serves for dynamic coordination of signals in the brain. In addition to working on the experimental validation of this hypothesis, Engel pursues research on its cognitive and theoretical implications.

As a postdoctoral researcher with Wolf Singer at the Max Planck Institute, Engel was involved in studies that demonstrated the relevance of neural synchrony, in particular of so-called gamma waves, for processing of perceptual information. In particular, the group provided evidence that temporal correlations can serve for the binding of features into coherent sensory representations.
In addition to addressing the relevance of synchrony and neuronal oscillations in the visual system, the work of Engel's group yielded evidence for a relation between neural synchrony and visual awareness. In addition, Engel and coworkers contributed to demonstrating a functional role of neural synchrony for sensorimotor coupling.

In the past 15 years, Engel's group has expanded their work to the human brain, using EEG and MEG in combination with source modeling techniques. The results of these studies demonstrate the importance of neuronal oscillations and synchrony for perceptual processing, attention, working memory, decision-making and consciousness.
Recent work of the group on the interaction of visual, auditory and tactile systems suggests a role of temporal binding for multisensory integration. The group has developed novel methods for the electrophysiological analysis of resting state network activity. Engel's group also applies these approaches for the study of network malfunction in patients with movement disorders, multiple sclerosis and schizophrenia, in studies on pain, and altered networks after early sensory deprivation. 
Engel also explores implications of these neurophysiogical results for theories of perception, cognition and action. A major focus of his work are the implications of the studies on neural synchrony for understanding the neural correlates of consciousness. Recent papers address links between neural dynamics and enactive views of cognition, investigating the grounding of cognition in sensorimotor coupling.

Honors and awards 
 1995-2000, Heisenberg-Fellowship, German Research Foundation (DFG)
 1997-1998 Daimler-Benz Fellowship at the Berlin Institute for Advanced Study, Germany
 2008, elected as member of the Academy of Sciences and Humanities in Hamburg, Germany
 2011, award of an ERC Advanced Grant, European Research Council (with P. König, University of Osnabrück)

Selected publications

Notes

External links 
 Website Dept. of Neurophysiology and Pathophysiology, UKE

Living people
German neuroscientists
1961 births